Nasrabad-e Seyyed Khalil (also Romanized as Naṣrābād-e Seyyed Khalīl; also known as Seyyed Khalīl) is a village in Fathabad Rural District, in the Central District of Qasr-e Shirin County, Kermanshah Province, Iran. At the 2006 census, its population was 258, in 65 families.

References 

Populated places in Qasr-e Shirin County